{{DISPLAYTITLE:BaSO4}}
The molecular formula BaSO4 (molar mass: 233.39 g/mol, exact mass: 233.8570 u) may refer to:

Barium sulfate
Baryte (or barite), a mineral made of barium sulfate

Inorganic molecular formulas